This article is a list of United States air force rescue squadrons both active, inactive, and historical. A rescue squadron's main task is to provide both combat, and peacetime search and rescue operations. Which involve the search for and the provision of aid to those in danger or distress, in combat the role may overlap somewhat with casualty evacuation operations.

Air Rescue Squadrons

Rescue Flights (RF)

Expeditionary Rescue Squadrons (ERQS)

Rescue Squadrons (RQS)

Aerospace Rescue and Recovery Squadrons

See also
 Air Rescue Service
 List of United States Air Force squadrons

References

Citations

Bibliography

Rescue
 *